Cremersia is a genus of flies in the family Phoridae.

Species
C. adunca Borgmeier, 1961
C. australis Borgmeier, 1928
C. bifidcauda Disney, 2007
C. brasiliensis Borgmeier, 1928
C. costalis Borgmeier, 1925
C. crassicostalis Disney, 2008
C. crassispina Borgmeier, 1928
C. longipes Borgmeier, 1971
C. pernambucana Borgmeier, 1925
C. pilipes Borgmeier, 1961
C. pilosa Borgmeier, 1928
C. salesiana Borgmeier, 1928
C. setitarsus Borgmeier, 1971
C. spinicauda Borgmeier, 1961
C. spinicosta (Malloch, 1912)
C. spinosissima Borgmeier, 1925
C. zikani Schmitz, 1924

References

Phoridae
Platypezoidea genera